Moshe Katz (1885–1960) was an anarchist and translator of multiple anarchist classics: Conquest of Bread, Moribund Society and Anarchy, and Prison Memoirs of an Anarchist. He was an editor of the Yiddish-language anarchist newspaper Fraye Arbeter Shtime in the 1890s, and an early member of the Pioneers of Liberty. He became the editor of the Yidishe velt (The Jewish World) in Philadelphia.

Notes

References

Bibliography

Further reading 

 
 

1885 births
1960 deaths
People from Dokshytsy District
People from Borisovsky Uyezd
Belarusian Jews
American anarchists
American people of Belarusian-Jewish descent
Editors of Fraye Arbeter Shtime
Jewish anarchists
Russian anarchists
Yiddish-language writers
Soviet anarchists